Mary Beth Stearns (née Gorman, born 1925) is an American solid-state physicist known for her work on magnetism.

Education and career
Stearns was born in Minneapolis, and graduated from the University of Minnesota in 1946. She completed a Ph.D. in nuclear physics in 1952 at Cornell University.

After completing her doctorate, she became a researcher at the Carnegie Institute of Technology. She moved to the University of Pittsburgh in 1957 and to General Dynamics in 1958 before becoming a researcher for the Ford Motor Company in 1960; she remained at Ford for over 20 years, and as a principal scientist became one of the earliest female executives at Ford.

In 1981, Stearns moved to Arizona State University as a professor of physics. She became Regent's Professor of Physics in 1988.

Research
Stearns' early research work involved nuclear Compton scattering, and the spectroscopy of mesonic atoms. Her work on gamma-ray scattering led her to study the Mössbauer effect and to use it to study the energy levels of iron atoms, and this in turn led her to nuclear magnetic resonance studies of magnetic ions, and to theoretical work on the quantum structure of these materials.

Recognition
Stearns became a Fellow of the American Physical Society in 1973.

References

1925 births
Living people
People from Minneapolis
Scientists from Minnesota
American physicists
American women physicists
University of Minnesota alumni
Cornell University alumni
Arizona State University faculty
Fellows of the American Physical Society
American women academics